The Hewitt Avenue Trestle is a causeway carrying U.S. Route 2 from Everett to Lake Stevens. It crosses the Snohomish River, Ebey Island, and the Ebey Slough. The western end of the trestle is an interchange with Interstate 5, while the eastern end is an interchange with State Route 204 and 20th Street.

The original wooden and concrete trestle was opened on January 15, 1936, carrying both directions of traffic and including a drawbridge over the Snohomish River. A parallel trestle to carry westbound traffic was partially opened on April 8, 1968, and fully opened with ceremonies on April 8, 1969, at a cost of $7.3 million. The trestle was converted into an expressway terminating at interchange with Interstate 5 and State Route 204. A new  eastbound trestle was built between 1993 and 2001 for $100 million, using reinforced concrete. 

A Washington State Transportation Commission report in 2018 listed replacement plans for the westbound trestle with a new, three-lane trestle at costs ranging from $620 million to $2 billion with funding by various means including up to $690 million in tolls.

References

Buildings and structures in Snohomish County, Washington
Road bridges in Washington (state)